Ivo Fabris (12 March 1910 – ?) was a Yugoslav rower. He competed at the 1936 Summer Olympics in Berlin with the men's coxed pair where they came sixth.

References

1910 births
Year of death missing
Yugoslav male rowers
Olympic rowers of Yugoslavia
Rowers at the 1936 Summer Olympics
European Rowing Championships medalists